Edward "Toiler" Harrison was an Australian rules footballer who played with South Melbourne in the Victorian Football League. Serving as a policeman during his playing days, he was killed in World War I.

See also
 List of Victorian Football League players who died in active service

Sources
Holmesby, Russell & Main, Jim (2007). The Encyclopedia of AFL Footballers. 7th ed. Melbourne: Bas Publishing.

1884 births
1917 deaths
Australian rules footballers from Victoria (Australia)
Sydney Swans players
Australian military personnel killed in World War I